Dhika Bayangkara (born 29 April 1992) is an Indonesian professional footballer who plays as a goalkeeper for Liga 1 club Persita Tangerang.

Club career

PS TNI
Dhika made his debut when PS TNI against Gresik United in the fourth week 2016 Indonesia Soccer Championship. A full-time Dhika also play PS TNI draw against PSM Makassar in the fifth week.

References

External links 
 
 Dhika Bayangkara at Liga Indonesia

1991 births
Living people
Indonesian footballers
Indonesian Premier Division players
Liga 1 (Indonesia) players
Persiba Balikpapan players
Persikad Depok players
PS TIRA players
PSMS Medan players
Persikabo 1973 players
PSS Sleman players
Persib Bandung players
Persita Tangerang players
People from Kuningan
Sportspeople from West Java
Association football goalkeepers